Artil is a village in Sanhan District of Sanaa Governorate, Yemen. It is located 2km due south of Bayt Baws.

Name 
According to A.B.D.R. Eagle, Artil is "manifestly the modern pronunciation" of the name; it is vocalized Artul in the Sīrat of Ali ibn Muhammad al-Abbasi, and this may be the older pronunciation of the name.

History 
The first known mention of is in the Ghāyat al-amānī, by Yahya ibn al-Husayn, which says that during Shawwal of 290 AH (August-September 903), Ali ibn al-Husay Khuftum, the former Abbasid governor of Sanaa, stayed at Artil for six days before being taken captive here and then imprisoned at Bayt Baws. According to Robert T.O. Wilson, Artil was used as "a base for movements against Sanaa rather than a fortifiable and defensible position" during this period.

References 

Villages in Sanaa Governorate